API testing is a type of software testing that involves testing application programming interfaces (APIs) directly and as part of integration testing to determine if they meet expectations for functionality, reliability, performance, and security. Since APIs lack a GUI, API testing is performed at the message layer. API testing is now considered critical for automating testing because APIs now serve as the primary interface to application logic and because GUI tests are difficult to maintain with the short release cycles and frequent changes commonly used with Agile software development and DevOps.

API testing overview
API testing involves testing APIs directly (in isolation) and as part of the end-to-end transactions exercised during integration testing. Beyond RESTful APIs, these transactions include multiple types of endpoints such as web services, ESBs, databases, mainframes, web UIs, and ERPs. API testing is performed on APIs that the development team produces as well as APIs that the team consumes within their application (including third-party APIs).

API testing is used to determine whether APIs return the correct response (in the expected format) for a broad range of feasible requests, react properly to edge cases such as failures and unexpected/extreme inputs, deliver responses in an acceptable amount of time, and respond securely to potential security attacks. Service virtualization is used in conjunction with API testing to isolate the services under test as well as expand test environment access by simulating APIs/services that are not accessible for testing.

API testing commonly includes testing REST APIs or SOAP web services with JSON or XML message payloads being sent over HTTP, HTTPS, JMS, and MQ. It can also include message formats such as SWIFT, FIX, EDI and similar fixed-length formats, CSV, ISO 8583 and Protocol Buffers being sent over 
transports/protocols such as TCP/IP, ISO 8583, MQTT, FIX, RMI, SMTP, TIBCO Rendezvous, and FIX.

API testing, GUI testing, and test automation
API Testing is recognised as being more suitable for test automation and continuous testing (especially the automation used with Agile software development and DevOps) than GUI testing. Reasons cited include:

 System complexity: GUI tests can't sufficiently verify functional paths and back-end APIs/services associated with multitier architectures. APIs are considered the most stable interface to the system under test.
 Short release cycles with fast feedback loops: Agile and DevOps teams working with short iterations and fast feedback loops find that GUI tests require considerable rework to keep pace with frequent change. Tests at the API layer are less brittle and easier to maintain.

For these reasons, it is recommended that teams increase their level of API testing while decreasing their reliance on GUI testing. API testing is recommended for the vast majority of test automation efforts and as much edge testing as possible. GUI testing is then reserved for validating typical use cases at the system level, mobile testing, and usability testing.

Types of API testing

API testing typically involves the following practices:

 Unit testing - Testing the functionality of individual operations.
 Functional testing - Testing the functionality of broader scenarios, often using unit tests as building blocks for end-to-end tests. Includes test case definition, execution, validation, and regression testing.
 Load testing  - Validating functionality and performance under load, often by reusing functional test cases.
 Runtime error detection - Monitoring an application the execution of automated or manual tests to expose problems such as race conditions, exceptions, and resource leaks.
 Security testing - Includes penetration testing and fuzz testing as well as validating authentication, encryption, and access control.
 Web UI testing - Performed as part of end-to-end integration tests that also cover APIs, enables teams to validate GUI items in the context of the larger transaction.
 Interoperability testing - (SOAP only) Checking conformance to Web Services Interoperability profiles.
 WS-* compliance testing - (SOAP only) Checking compliance to WS-* standards such as WS-Addressing, WS-Discovery, WS-Federation, WS-Policy, WS-Security, and WS-Trust.
 Penetration testing - testing a computer system, network or Web application to find vulnerabilities that an attacker could exploit.
 Fuzz-testing - massive amounts of purely random data, sometimes referred to as "noise" or "fuzz", is forcibly input into the system in order to attempt a forced crash, overflow, or other negative behavior. This is done to test the API at its absolute limits, and serves somewhat as a "worst case scenario".

Software

See also

 Automated testing
 Service virtualization
 Software testing
 Web API security

References

Software testing